Breaking the Bank is a 2014 British comedy film directed by Vadim Jean and starring Kelsey Grammer.

Cast
Kelsey Grammer as Charles
John Michael Higgins as Richard Grinding
Tamsin Greig as Penelope
Mathew Horne as Nick
Julie Dray as Sophie
Andrew Sachs as Jenkins

Production
Principal photography began in London in April 2014.

Release
The film premiered at the Dubai International Film Festival in December 2014.  It was released theatrically in the United Kingdom on June 3, 2016.

Reception
Leslie Felperin of The Guardian awarded the film three stars out of five and wrote that "it’s diverting enough to pass muster, thanks to a seasoned cast."

The Hollywood Reporter gave the film a positive review: "In any case, audiences should enjoy seeing Grammer playing a Brit with such relaxed nonchalance, and his scenes with the versatile comedienne and stage actress Greig are thoroughly delightful."

Mark Adams of Screen Daily gave the film a negative review and wrote, "...despite the best efforts of Grammer and co-star Tamsin Greig this old-fashioned effort rarely clicks, with the muddled script offering nice ideas but little follow-through.”

References

External links
 
 

2014 films